Stenzel is a German surname. Notable people with the surname include:

Dorothy Hester Stenzel (1910–1991), American aviator, stunt pilot
Fabian Stenzel (born 1986), German footballer
Jake Stenzel (1867–1919), American baseball player
Jamie Stenzel (born 2002), birth name of Au/Ra, Antiguan-German singer-songwriter
Martin Stenzel (born 1946), German cyclist
Martina Stenzel, Australian chemistry researcher
Rüdiger Stenzel (born 1968), German middle distance runner
Scott Stenzel (born 1980), American racing driver
Torsten Stenzel (born 1971), German musician and record producer
Ursula Stenzel (born 1945), Austrian politician
Vlado Stenzel, "The Wizard" (born 1934), Croatian handballer and well-reputed handball coach

German-language surnames